The Oklahoma Policy Institute (OK Policy) is a nonpartisan think tank located in Tulsa, Oklahoma.

Founding and Mission

OK Policy was founded in 2008 by David Blatt, Vincent LoVoi, and Steven Dow. It grew out of the public policy department of the Community Action Project of Tulsa County, where Blatt had been director of public policy. Blatt began his tenure at OK Policy as director of policy. In 2010, Blatt replaced Matt Guillory as executive director, and the organization's main office was moved from Oklahoma City, Oklahoma, to Tulsa. Through 2010, Blatt was the organization's only full-time employee. In 2011, two additional full-time staff members were hired. In 2012, Oklahoma Policy Institute hired an Outreach Coordinator. In 2019, Ahniwake Rose became the executive director.

According to its website, OK Policy "advances equitable and fiscally responsible policies that expand opportunity for all Oklahomans through non-partisan research, analysis, and advocacy." and "our core commitments are to the adequate, fair, and fiscally responsible funding of public services, and to an economy that provides shared prosperity through increased economic opportunity and financial security for all. Our main issue areas are: state budget and tax issues; programs serving low- and moderate-income Oklahomans; and policies promoting financial security and prosperity."

Collaborations and Affiliations

Oklahoma Policy Institute is affiliated with two networks of state policy research organizations. The first is the State Priorities Partnership (SPP), a collaboration coordinated by the Center on Budget and Policy Priorities. The second is the Economic Analysis Research Network (EARN), coordinated by the Economic Policy Institute.

Involvement in Income Tax Debate, 2012

In 2012, members of the Oklahoma Republican Party in the Oklahoma Legislature began advocating a decrease in, or abolition of, the income tax. OK Policy helped form a coalition of stakeholders that would be impacted by income tax cuts. Stakeholders included the Oklahoma Education Association, The Oklahoma State School Boards Association, and The Oklahoma Institute for Child Advocacy. This group was called Together Oklahoma.

In April 2012, OK Policy hosted an Economist Forum in Oklahoma City. Speakers at the forum included economists and state officials.

OK Policy advocated against the income tax cut, while Oklahoma Council of Public Affairs advocated for the cut.

Position on State Question 744, 2010

Oklahoma State Question 744 was a Ballot Measure that proposed to amend the Oklahoma Constitution to require the Legislature to fund public education at or above the per-pupil average of neighboring states. Oklahoma Policy Institute opposed the measure after the organization released a report which found that the initiative would cost the state $1.7 billion. Oklahoma Policy Institute further stated that the cost of the measure would worsen existing budget shortfalls.

State Question 744 was defeated in the general election.

References

Think tanks based in the United States
2008 establishments in Oklahoma